A chief creative officer (CCO) is the highest ranking position of the creative team within a company. Depending on the type of company, this position may be responsible for the overall look and feel of marketing, media, and branding associated with the organization. The CCO may also be charged with managing, developing, and leading the team of creative directors, art directors, designers, and copywriters.

Overall description

The CCO directs a company's creative output, developing the artistic design strategy that defines the company's brand. The CCO creates the unique image of the firm and deliver this distinctive design to consumers and to create a clear brand image which is a fundamental and essential work throughout the company. Advertisements present a certain memorable artistic design while also structured to accomplish functional goals. The CCO ensures that the design and functionality combine harmoniously so the firm can present a product that successfully represents its creative brand.

Notable chief creative officers
 Riccardo Tisci of Burberry
 Raf Simons of Calvin Klein
 Jennifer Lee of Walt Disney Animation Studios
Kevin Feige of Marvel Entertainment
 Pete Docter of Pixar
 Matthew Mercer of Critical Role
 Jessica Alba of The Honest Company
 Burnie Burns of Rooster Teeth Productions
 Nick Cannon of Radio Shack
 Hugh Hefner of Playboy Enterprises
 Alan Horn of Walt Disney Studios
 Jim Lee of DC Entertainment
 will.i.am of 3D Systems
 Sarah Michelle Gellar of Foodstirs
 Wong Cho-lam of TVB
 Roberto Aguirre-Sacasa of Archie Comics
 Jens Peder Bergensten of Mojang Studios (developer of Minecraft)
 Clive Davis of Sony Music Entertainment
 Paul "Triple H" Levesque of WWE
 Seth MacFarlane of Fuzzy Door Productions
 Tony Khan of All Elite Wrestling

References

Arts occupations
Business terms
Communication design
C
Management occupations